DiVincenzo or Di Vincenzo is a surname. Notable people with the surname include:

Di Vincenzo
Antonio di Vincenzo (1350–1401/1402), Italian architect 
Mattia Di Vincenzo (born 1992), Italian footballer 
Yésica Di Vincenzo (born 1987), Argentine beauty pageant

DiVincenzo
David DiVincenzo (born 1959), American theoretical physicist
Donte DiVincenzo (born 1997), American basketball player
Josie DiVincenzo, American television and film actress
Joseph N. DiVincenzo Jr. (born 1952), American county executive, Essex County, New Jersey

See also
DiVincenzo's criteria, conditions necessary for constructing a quantum computer
Loss–DiVincenzo quantum computer a scalable semiconductor-based quantum computer
Vincenzo